The 1990 Segunda División Peruana, the second division of Peruvian football (soccer), was played by 20 teams. The tournament winner, Hijos de Yurimaguas was promoted to the 1991 Torneo Descentralizado.

Results

Zona Norte

Zona Metropolitana

Zona Sur

Liguilla

Zona Sur

References
 La Campaña del Retorno : 1989

Peruvian Segunda División seasons
Peru2
2